Kärlekssång från mig is a ballad written by Patrik Henzel and Karl Eurén, and performed by Markoolio at Melodifestivalen 2009. The song participated in the second competition, inside the Skellefteå Kraft Arena on 14 February 2009, but was knocked out.

The single peaked at number 22 on the Swedish singles chart.

The song's lyrics describe things within Swedish popular music who aren't excepted to appear, like a duet between Joakim Thåström and Carola Häggkvist, or Kent appearing during the Diggiloo tour, or that Markoolio should start singing love ballads.

Charts

References

 Information at Svensk mediedatabas

2009 singles
Melodifestivalen songs of 2009
Swedish-language songs
Markoolio songs
Songs about music
2009 songs